Ostracocoelia is a genus of tephritid or fruit flies in the family Tephritidae.

Species
Ostracocoelia mirabilis Giglio-Tos, 1893

References

Tephritinae
Tephritidae genera
Diptera of North America